Darla Records is an independent record label founded by James Agren in October 1993 while he was in New York. Darla's first release was a 7-inch by Grifters, an indie rock/lo-fi band from Memphis.

Background 
The music of the artists on the label includes indie pop, indie rock, electronica, ambient, and Americana. Darla is a label, distributor, and online retailer. Darla Records is home to over 200 exclusively distributed labels including Ad Noiseam, Audio Dregs Recordings, Ici d'Ailleurs, Elefant, LTM, Le Grand Magistery, Matinee, Ohm Resistance, Siesta, and Words On Music.

The label created a series, known as Bliss Out in 1996. The series focused on ambient, electronic, and instrumental music. The moniker for the series is a reference to Blissed Out: The Rapture of Rock — a tome authored by Simon Reynolds, a notable rock music critic based in Britain. The Little Darla Has A Treat For You semi-quarterly compilation series features artists and labels Darla Records works with closely, and is very popular. This series was named after the Little Debbie snack treats.

The label's moniker is not a reference to Darla Hood, the little girl from the Our Gang comedies (known as The Little Rascals on television), but comes from a yet-to-be-acknowledged bit of Americana. James noted while record collecting that many regional independent labels in the 1950s had women's names and national hits: Laurie, Paula, Sue, Tamla, etc. In the 1980s and 1990s there were popular indie-pop labels Sarah and Harriet.

Since 1993, Darla has been a label and distributor. Darla started selling music online in 1996. In February 2007, American webzine Somewhere Cold voted Darla record label of the year on their 2006 Somewhere Cold Awards Hall of Fame. in 2009, Darla began offering digital downloads from their own website. James Agren and Chandra Tobey run Darla Records from a  barn on their avocado and cherimoya farm in the hills of north San Diego county.

Bliss Out series
In 1996, Darla Records asked for contributions to a double album featuring music on the calmer, "sleepier" side of music, such as shoegaze and ambient music. They would receive a submission from New Jersey band Flowchart. The label liked the track they sent so much that, instead of creating a double album, they would instead ask contributing bands to create EPs/albums of these tracks. Flowchart sent three more tracks, and the resulting collection of songs would be Tenjira, the first album in the "Bliss Out" series. The series would end in 2004, after 20 releases, with the release of Manual's The North Shore. Every release in this series is meant to invoke peacefulness and "bliss". The releases in this series are:
Tenjira (Flowchart)
Antarctica (Windy & Carl)
Silver Lining Underwear (Orange Cake Mix)
Perception (Amp)
Venoy (Füxa)
Stereoscopic Soundwaves (Tomorrowland)
Anadromous (Mirza)
Wading & Waiting (Transient Waves)
Late One Sunday & The Following Morning (American Analog Set)
Taking Care of You (Junior Varsity KM)
Halica (Sweet Trip)
Blue Christian (Bright)
A Trick of the Sea (Piano Magic)
The Long Goodbye (The Cat's Miaow)
Zero Population Growth (Lilys)
Normal Control Range (Technicolor)
Aida (Mus)
...Or You Could Just Go Through Your Whole Life And Be Happy Anyway. (Aarktica)
Belmondo (Japancakes)
The North Shore (Manual)

Acts on label
Since its inception, Darla has been host to several notable acts. Musical outfits whose recordings have been released by this label include:

Aarktica
Alsace Lorraine
American Analog Set
Amp
Ariel Abshire
Auburn Lull
Bright
Bvdub
California Oranges
Desario
Flare
Flowchart
Follow the Train
Füxa
Hammock
Harold Budd
Holiday Flyer
hollAnd
I Am Robot and Proud
ISAN
Japancakes
Junior Varsity KM
LD & the New Criticism
Lilys
Lowlights
Mahogany
Manual
Maquiladora
Mirza
My Morning Jacket
New Radiant Storm King
Orange Cake Mix
Pale Horse and Rider
Photon Band
Piano Magic
Rhian Sheehan
Robin Guthrie
Rocketship
Rumskib
Saloon
Sisterhood of Convoluted Thinkers
Sprites
Superdrag
Stafrænn Hákon
Steven R. Smith
Sweet Trip
The Radio Dept.
30 Amp Fuse
Tomorrowland
Tullycraft
Voxtrot
Windy & Carl

Geography
James and Chandra relocated Darla to Sacramento, California in October 2000. Darla moved in October 2002 to Vista, California.

See also
 List of record labels

References

External links
 

Indie pop record labels
Electronic music record labels
American independent record labels
Record labels established in 1994
Vista, California
1994 establishments in California